Didi – Der Untermieter is a German television series. ZDF initially broadcast the series under the name Die Nervensäge. However, the title had to be changed later due to a legal dispute.  The show is based on the 1982 BBC series Goodbye, Mr. Kent, which is adapted from the Broadway play The Odd Couple by Neil Simon.

See also
List of German television series

External links
 

German comedy television series
1985 German television series debuts
1986 German television series endings
German-language television shows
ZDF original programming

References